Lost Property is the third novel of Laura Beatty, first published in 2019 by Atlantic Books.

Plot introduction
A writer, despairs over London so leaves with her lover Rupert, in a clapped out camper van through France, to the Mediterranean, Italy the Balkans and finally to the Greek island of Chios where they help a refugee camp before returning to Britain via Crete. On the way she meets 10,000 years of civilization with many historical figures from Joan of Arc to James Joyce as she questions them on her spiritual journey through Europe.

Reception
Christobel Kent in The Guardian praises the novel, 'this shifting, unsure quality, made luminous with an extraordinary descriptive brilliance, emerges as the book's strength. The narrative is highly wrought but never laboured, and always humanly tentative, as a quest should be. The last thing Lost Property's narrator wants is to be any kind of authority. Rather, she is a receiver, a channel for other voices, other eyes. She stumbles, she forgets, she contrives to be out of earshot when definitive solutions are expounded. And at the journey's end, when she stands on the shore watching the black boats bobbing towards Greece with their shivering cargoes, what is learned through this magical, shapeshifting narrative is the preciousness not of conviction but of uncertainty, if it is shared as part of our common humanity.

Journey and people

Boulogne-sur-Mer
Eustace II
Auguste Mariette
Troyes
Henry V
Joan of Arc
Beaune
Nicolas Rolin
Marseilles
Pierre Puget
Camargue
Folco de Baroncelli-Javon
Lake Garda
Gabriele D'Annunzio
Henry Dunant
Christine de Pizan
Ferrara
Elisabetta Gonzaga & Isabella d'Este
Ludovico Ariosto
Trieste
James Joyce
Sarajevo
Gavrilo Princip
Lemnos
Yannis Ritsos
Philoctetes

References

External links
Laura Beatty: Insight and wonder

2019 British novels
English novels
Novels about writers
Cultural depictions of Gabriele D'Annunzio
Cultural depictions of Gavrilo Princip                             
Atlantic Books books